About us may refer to:

About Us (novel), 1967 a novel by Chester Aaron
"About Us" (song), a 2007 song by Brooke Hogan
About Us (album), a 2019 album by Australian pop singer, G Flip
About Us (film), a 2016 Costa Rican film
AboutUs.com, a wiki directory of company and organization "self-portraits"

See also
About (disambiguation)